A Guilty Conscience is a 1921 American silent drama film directed by David Smith and starring Antonio Moreno, Betty Francisco and Harry von Meter.

Cast
 Antonio Moreno as Gilbert Thurstan
 Betty Francisco as Emily Thurstan
 Harry von Meter as Vincent Chalmers 
 Lila Leslie as Ida Seabury
 John MacFarlane as James Roberts

References

Bibliography
 Munden, Kenneth White. The American Film Institute Catalog of Motion Pictures Produced in the United States, Part 1. University of California Press, 1997.

External links
 

1921 films
1921 drama films
1920s English-language films
American silent feature films
Silent American drama films
American black-and-white films
Vitagraph Studios films
Films directed by David Smith (director)
1920s American films